Epsilon Serpentis, Latinized from ε Serpentis, is a single, white-hued star in the constellation Serpens, in its head (Serpens Caput). It is visible to the naked eye with an apparent visual magnitude of +3.69. Based upon an annual parallax shift of 46.30 mas as seen from Earth, it is located 70 light years from the Sun. It is moving closer to the Sun with a radial velocity of −9 km/s.

This is an Am star on the main-sequence with a stellar classification of kA2hA5mA7 V. This notation indicates the spectrum displays the calcium K-line of an A2 star, the hydrogen lines of an A5 star, and the metal lines of an A7 star. It has been examined for the presence of a magnetic field, but the detected level was not statistically significant.

Epsilon Serpentis has an estimated 1.82 times the mass of the Sun and 1.78 times the Sun's radius. The star is radiating 12 times the Sun's luminosity from its photosphere at an effective temperature of around 7,928 K. It is a candidate for an infrared excess at a wavelength of 25 μm, suggesting a circumstellar disk of dust with a temperature of  may be orbiting roughly 4.2 AU from the host star. The star is around half a billion years old and is spinning with a projected rotational velocity of 33.1 km/s.

Etymology
Epsilon Serpentis was a member of indigenous Arabic asterism al-Nasaq al-Yamānī, "the Southern Line" of al-Nasaqān "the Two Lines". along with α Ser (Unukalhai), δ Ser, δ Oph (Yed Prior), ε Oph (Yed Posterior), ζ Oph and γ Oph.

According to the catalogue of stars in the Technical Memorandum 33-507 - A Reduced Star Catalog Containing 537 Named Stars, al-Nasaq al-Yamānī or Nasak Yamani were the title for two stars :δ Ser as Nasak Yamani I and ε Ser as Nasak Yamani II (exclude α Ser, δ Oph, ε Oph, ζ Oph and γ Oph).

References

A-type main-sequence stars
Am stars
Circumstellar disks
Serpentis, Epsilon
Serpens (constellation)
Durchmusterung objects
Serpentis, 37
141795
077622
5892
Nasak Yamani II